The Yakovlev AIR-13 was a projected twin-engined racing aircraft designed during 1935 in the Soviet union, intended to participate in air races planned for 1936. Contemporary sketches show that the design bore a close similarity to the de Havilland DH.88 Comet, that had proved successful in the 1934 MacRobertson Trophy Air Race. The design did not progress beyond the drawing board.

References

1930s Soviet sport aircraft
AIR-13
Low-wing aircraft
Twin piston-engined tractor aircraft